The Lao eggplant, also known as Lao aubergine, is a local variety of eggplant found in Laos and used primarily in Lao cuisine. Common cultivar types in Laos are Lao Green Stripe, Lao Purple Stripe, Lao Lavender, and Lao White. They are usually round and roughly the size of a golf ball.

Lao eggplants are used in Lao curry dishes, roasted for Lao eggplant dipping sauces, served raw with traditional Lao dishes like larb, and sometimes used in Lao papaya salad. A common Lao vegetable stew that uses Lao eggplant is or lam''.

See also
Thai eggplant for common cultivar types in Thailand such as Thai Purple, Thai Green, Thai Yellow, and Thai White.
Vietnamese eggplant

References

Eggplants

vi:Cà pháo